The Tamaki Titans (originally Tamaki Leopards) were a franchise in the now defunct New Zealand rugby league Bartercard Cup competition. They represented Eastern Auckland, this area was previously represented by the Otahuhu Ellerslie Leopards and the Eastern Tornadoes. Their coach, Dean Clark, was a former standoff who played for the Kiwis, New Zealand Māori, Hull KR & the Counties Manukau Heroes.

Notable players

New Zealand Warriors associated with the club included: George Tuakura, Manu Vatuvei, Cooper Vuna, Ruben Wiki while other players included Elijah Taylor, Constantine Mika, Leeson Ah Mau and Paul Atkins.

2006 Results

In 2006 they performed strongly, finishing fourth. They then went on to defeat the Counties Manukau Jetz in the first week of the playoffs and then pip the Waitakere Rangers 25–24 in an extra time thriller. They then lost in the preliminary final to the Canterbury Bulls.

2007 Results

The Titans finished fifth overall, just missing out on a playoff position.

Gallery

Auckland rugby league clubs
Defunct rugby league teams in New Zealand
Rugby clubs established in 2006
2006 establishments in New Zealand
2008 disestablishments in New Zealand